Office management is a profession involving the design, implementation, evaluation, and maintenance of the process of work within an office or other organization, in order to sustain and improve efficiency and productivity.

Office management is thus a part of the overall administration of business and since the elements of management are forecasting and planning, organizing, command, control and coordination, the office is a part of the total management function.

Office management is the technique of planning, organizing, coordinating and controlling office activities with a view to achieve business objectives and is concerned with efficient and effective performance of the office work. The success of a business depends upon the efficiency of its office. The volume of paper work in offices has increased manifold in these days due to industrialization, population explosion, government control and application of various tax and labour laws to any business enterprise. Efficiency and effectiveness which are key words in management are achieved only through proper planning and control of activities, reduction of office costs and coordination of all activities of business.

In simple words, office management can be defined as “a distinct process of planning, organizing, staffing, directing, coordinating and controlling office in order to facilitate achievement of objectives of any business enterprise’ the definition shows managerial functions of an administrative manager. Following diagram indicates various elements or functions in the process of office management.

Importance of Office Management 
The following point enlightens the importance of office management:

(i) Helps in Achievement of Targets 
Targets or goals are results in quantitative terms which are to be achieved in a given time. Management makes people realize the goals and directs their efforts towards the achievement of these goals.

(ii) Optimum Use of Resources 
Management helps in utilization of resources effectively. Scarce resources are put to use optimistically by managers. Managers bring about coordination and integration of various resources. It is management which guides the personnel in office in the use of resources.

(iii) Minimization of Costs 
Office costs can be reduced under the guidance and control of efficient management. Office Management is concerned with doing the office activities in a best and cheapest way. Cost reduction is one of the object of management which can be achieved through work simplification and mechanization. Through better planning, sound organization and effective control, management enables a concern to reduce costs and prepare an enterprise to face cut throat competition.

(iv) Smooth Flow of Work 
Uninterrupted flow of work is only possible if there is proper planning and control. Management ensures efficient and smooth flow of work.

(v) Helps in Maintaining Office Efficiency 
Management helps in maintaining efficiency in an office. A manager not only performs and produces results, but may do it in the most efficient manner so as to contribute towards profit generation.

(vi) Managing Survival and Growth 
Management has to play an important role in keeping the organization alive. Change in technology and methods must be anticipated and adapted for survival and growth. It is only management which can do so and molds the enterprise in such a changing environment.

(vii) Provides Innovation 
Innovation is finding new, different and better method of doing existing work. To plan and manage innovation, management has to play an important role. Suggestions from customers, information from salesmen, close watch on competitor’s activities provide source of innovation.

(viii) Helps in Retaining Talent and Inculcating Sense of Loyalty in Office Staff 
Efficient management helps in retaining talented and hard working employees by providing them comfortable work environment. Manager must motivate his employees by recognizing and appreciating their talents.

(ix) Provides Leadership 
Management provides leadership by influencing and guiding office personnel. Managers influence his subordinates to work willingly for achieving organizational goals.

(x) Managing Change 
Importance of office management is that it helps in planning the change and introducing it at the right time and in the right manner. Due to change in technology methods, work procedures etc. have to be changed for efficiency and economy. People resist change due to lack of understanding the reasons for change and lack of training in new methods. Management helps in minimizing resistance of people and acts as a change-agent.

(xi) Maintaining Public Relations 
Office management helps in improving public relations and increasing goodwill of an enterprise by dealing with grievances of consumers and general public.

(xii) Social Benefits 
Management is beneficial not only to the business enterprises but to the various segments of society also. It provides and maintains link with various types of suppliers, banks, insurance companies, government departments, and general public. It benefits society as a whole by providing its services.

Functions
An office manager is responsible for monitoring and reviewing systems, usually focusing on specific outcomes such as improved timescales, turnover, output, sales, etc. They may supervise or manage a team of administrators, allocating roles, recruiting and training, and issuing assignments and projects. As such the role is varied, often including responsibilities across a diverse range of functions such as: 

Personal competencies useful in the role are: problem solving skills, good decision making abilities, integrity, resourcefulness, creativity, assertiveness, flexibility, time management skills and the ability to cope with pressure.

See also
Chief administrative officer
Office equipment
Association of Information Technology Professionals (AITP)

Further reading 

Management by type
Management